Christopher Keith Wallace-Crabbe  (born 6 May 1934) is an Australian poet and emeritus professor in the Australian Centre, University of Melbourne.

Life and career
Wallace-Crabbe was born in the Melbourne suburb of Richmond. His father was Kenneth Eyre Inverell Wallace-Crabbe, painter, printmaker, journalist and publisher, pilot in the RAF and ending World War II as Group Captain, and his mother Phyllis Vera May Cox Passmore was a pianist, and his brother Robin Wallace-Crabbe became an artist. He was educated at Scotch College, Yale University and the University of Melbourne, where for much of his life he has worked and is now a professor emeritus in the Australian Centre.  He was Visiting Professor of Australian Studies at Harvard University and at the University of Venice, Ca'Foscari.  He is also an essayist, a critic of the visual arts and a notable public reader of his verse.  He was the founding director of the Australian Centre and, more recently, chair of the peak artistic body, Australian Poetry Limited.

After leaving school, Wallace-Crabbe set out to be a metallurgist, but was drawn back to his childhood interest in books and art. After training in the Royal Australian Air Force, he worked as an electrical trade journalist while studying for his B.A. in the evenings. He published his first book of poetry while doing his final honours year.  In 1961 he became Lockie Fellow in Australian Literature and Creative Writing at the University of Melbourne.

Over the next decades he became a reader in English and then held a personal chair from 1988. On the initiative of H. C. Coombs, he was a Harkness Fellow at Yale University from 1965 to 1967, mixing widely with American writers and developing his poetry in new directions. In later years he has spent time in Italy, reading and translating Italian verse, including two contrast cantos from Dante. He was also a member of the Psychosocial Group, an occasional body with psychoanalytic as well as cultural interests.

Wallace-Crabbe's early collections were published in Australia, but in 1985 he began to publish with Oxford University Press, reaching an international public. Although he published some of his criticism and his one novel elsewhere, he remained with Oxford until 1998, after which date the Press ceased publishing live poets. He then took his work to Carcanet Oxford Poets, in Manchester. Back in Australia he brought out two books with the Sydney firm of Brandl & Schlesinger. One of these was a highly experimental long poem, or "zany epic", on which he had been working for a dozen years. It would be fair to say that this dense and difficult poem divided the poet's readers.

Reviewers over the years have drawn attention time and again to the energetic mixture of demotic and elevated language which very often marks Wallace-Crabbe's poetry. For the poet, this not only testifies to his wide interest in language but also to his sense of the stubborn plurality of our experience. Such mixed diction certainly persists in his very latest books, particularly in his sonnets and in the "Domestic Sublime" sequence of lyrics. This corresponds to his sense that poetry is, residually, a sacred art with its attention divided between ontology and finely-detailed epistemology. It should be added that for Wallace-Crabbe our lives unreasonably mingle the comic with the tragic.

Since his retirement from university teaching he has continued to live in inner Melbourne, adhering to poetry, reading history and playing tennis.

In May 2014, Wallace-Crabbe alluded to the possibility of a collaboration with a Melbourne writer, Christopher Bantick, however, he is currently working on the history of Western magic, and on a series of prints, with Kristin Headlam, based upon his long poem mentioned above.

Awards
 1958 – John Masefield Prize for Poetry
 1986 – Grace Leven Prize for Poetry
 1987 – The Dublin Prize for Arts and Science, awarded through the University of Melbourne
 1992 – Human Rights and Equal Opportunity Commission Poettry Award with Kerry Flattley for From the Republic of Conscience 
 1995 –  winner of "The Age" Book of the Year, and the D.J. O'Hearn Prize for Poetry
  2002 – winner of the Philip Hodgins Memorial Medal at the Mildura Writer's Festival
 2002 – Centenary Medal
 2006 – Doctor of Letters honoris causa (Melb.)
 2011 – appointed a Member of the Order of Australia (AM)
 2015 – Melbourne Prize for Literature
2019 – NSW Premier's Literary Awards, Kenneth Slessor Prize for Poetry, shortlisted for Rondo.

Bibliography

Poetry
Collections
 1959: The Music of Division, Sydney: Angus & Robertson
 1962: Eight Metropolitan Poems, Adelaide: Australian Letters; with John Brack
 1963: In Light and Darkness, Sydney: Angus & Robertson
 1963: Eight By Eight, Brisbane: Jacaranda Press, 1963: anthology of eight poems each by Vincent Buckley, Laurence Collinson, Alexander Craig, Max Dunn, Noel Macainsh, David Martin, R.A. Simpson, and Chris Wallace-Crabbe.
 1967: The Rebel General, Sydney: Angus & Robertson
 1971: Where the Wind Came, Sydney: Angus and Robertson
 1973: Selected Poems, Sydney: Angus & Robertson
 1976: The Foundations of Joy, (Poets of the Month Series), Sydney: Angus & Robertson
 1979: The Emotions Are Not Skilled Workers, Sydney: Angus & Robertson
 1985: The Amorous Cannibal, Oxford: Oxford University Press
 1988: I'm Deadly Serious, Oxford: Oxford University Press
 1989: Sangue e l'acqua, translated and edited by Giovann Distefano, Abano Terme:  Piovan Editore 
 1990: For Crying Out Loud, Oxford: Oxford University Press
 1993: Rungs of Time, Oxford: Oxford University Press 
 1995: Selected Poems 1956–1994, Oxford: Oxford University Press
 1998: Whirling, Oxford: Oxford University Press
 2001: By and Large, Manchester: Carcanet; and Sydney; Brandl and Schlesinger
 2003: A Representative Human, Brunswick: Gungurru Press 
 2004: Next, Brunswick: Gungurru Press
 2005: The Universe Looks Down, Brandl & Schlesinger, 
 2006: Then, Brunswick: Gungurru Press
 2008: Telling a Hawk from a Handsaw, Manchester Carcanet Oxford Poets
 2010: Puck, Brunswick: Gungurru Press
 2012: New and Selected Poems, Manchester: Carcanet Oxford Poets
 2014: My Feet Are Hungry, Sydney: Pitt Street Poets
 2018: Rondo, Carcanet Press
Recordings
 1973: Vinyl record: Chris Wallace-Crabbe Reads From His Own Verse, St Lucia
 1999:  "The Universe Looks Down", with Linda Kouvaras, Move Records
 2000: The Poems; Brunswick: Gungurru Press
 2009: "The Domestic Sublime", Sydney:  River Road Press
List of poems

Fiction
 1981: Splinters, Adelaide

Literary criticism
 1974: Melbourne or the Bush: Essays on Australian  Literature and Society, Sydney: Angus & Robertson
 1979: Toil and Spin: Two Directions in Modern  Poetry, Melbourne: Hutchinson
 1983: Three Absences in Australian Writing, Townsville: Foundation for Australian Literary Studies
 1990: Poetry and Belief, Hobart: University of  Tasmania, 1990
 1990: Falling into Language, Melbourne: Oxford University Press
 2005:  "Read It Again", Cambridge:  Salt

Book reviews
 Review of

Edited
 1963: Six Voices: Contemporary Australian Poets, Sydney: Angus & Robertson; American Edition, Westport, 1979
 1971: Australian Poetry 1971, Sydney: Angus & Robertson
 1980: The Golden Apples of the Sun: Twentieth Century Australian Poetry, Melbourne: Melbourne University Press.
 1981: The Australian Nationalists: Modern Critical Essays, Melbourne: Oxford University Press, (with Peter Pierce),
 1984: Clubbing of the Gunfire: 101 Australian War Poems, Melbourne: Melbourne University Press, 1984 (with D. Goodman and D.J. Hearn)
 1911: Multicultural Australia: the Challenges of Change, Newham (with Kerry Flattley),
 1992: From the Republic of Conscience, Melbourne: Aird Books in association with Amnesty International; and New York: White Pine Press, 1992 (with Kerry Flattley and Sigurdur A. Magnusson), 
 1994: Ur Riki Samviskunnar, Reykjavik: Amnesty International
 1998: Author, Author! Tales of Australian Literary Life, Melbourne: O.U.P., 1998 (with Harold Bolitho)
 1998: Associate Editor (with Bruce Bennett and Jennifer Strauss): The Oxford Literary History of Australia, Melbourne: Oxford University Press
 1998: Approaching Australia: Papers from the Harvard Australian Studies Symposium, Cambridge, Massachusetts: Harvard University Committee on Australian Studies
 2002: La Poésie Australienne, Valenciennes: Presses Universitaires, (with Simone Kadi)
 2004:  "Imagining Australia:  Literature and Culture in the New New World",  Cambridge Mass:  Harvard University Committee on Australian Studies.  With Judith Ryan
 2009:  "Mappings of the Plane: New Selected Poems" by Gwen Harwood (with Gregory Kratzmann), Manchester: Carcanet Fyfield Books

Artist's books with the artist Bruno Leti
 1994:  "Drawing", Melbourne:  Australian Print Workshop
 1995:  "Apprehensions", Melbourne:  the artist
 1996:  "New Year", Melbourne and Canberra:  the artist
 1996:  "The Iron Age", Melbourne:  the artist
 1999:  "Timber", New York:  the artist and Raphael Fodde;  with Inge and Grahame King
 2001:  "The Alignments Two", Melbourne:  the artist
 2002:  "Colours", Melbourne:  the artist
 2004:  "The Alignments One", Melbourne:  the artist
 2005:  "Morandrian", the artist and Alan Loney
 2011: "Camaldulensis", Melbourne: the artist

Other artists' books
 2006:  "All Writing Still is to be Done", Vicenza:  L'Officina;  with Marco Fazzini and Gianluca Murasecchi
 2005:  "The Flowery Meadow" (after Dante), Melbourne:  Electio Editions;  with Alan Loney and Bruno Leti
 2007:  "Skin, Surfaces and Shadows", Warrandyte;  with Tommaso Durante
 2011:  "limes", Warrandyte; with Tommaso Durante

Critical studies and reviews
New and selected poems

References

External links
 Poetry library
 Website
 Michael Sharkey 'Starting from Melbourne: The Coherence of Chris Wallace-Crabbe' JASAL 6 (2007)

1934 births
Australian poets
Living people
Harvard University staff
Academic staff of the Ca' Foscari University of Venice
University of Melbourne alumni
People educated at Scotch College, Melbourne
Members of the Order of Australia
Meanjin people